Glass House Rock is the fifth studio album by Greg Kihn and the second album to be released as The Greg Kihn Band in 1980.

Glass House Rock broke new ground for The Greg Kihn Band and is notable for its hard rock sound. The song "Castaway" uses fast-paced finger-play in the vein of Love's "7 and 7 Is" with underlapping guitar tracks.

The album has noticeably more collaborative compositions and sharing of vocal duties, featuring lead vocals by both Larry Lynch and Steve Wright on the songs "The Man Who Shot Liberty Valance" and "Night After Night" respectively. Lynch and Wright also provided lead vocals alongside Kihn for "The Only Dance There Is" as well as a cover version of The Yardbirds' "For Your Love".

"For Your Love" was recorded in front of a live audience at a sound check at the Keystone Berkeley, California.

Track listing

Personnel
The Greg Kihn Band
Greg Kihn - lead vocals (1-6, 8), rhythm guitar
Dave Carpender - lead guitar, backing vocals
Steve Wright - bass, backing and lead (9, 10) vocals
Larry Lynch - drums, backing and lead (7, 10) vocals
Additional personnel
Gary Phillips - keyboards

Production
Producer: Matthew King Kaufman
Logistics: Brian Murray

References

1980 albums
Greg Kihn albums
Beserkley Records albums